This is a record of Poland's results at the FIFA World Cup. They have qualified for the finals on nine occasions, most recently in 2022. The FIFA World Cup is an international association football competition contested by the men's national teams of the members of Fédération Internationale de Football Association (FIFA), the sport's global governing body. The championship has been awarded every four years since the first tournament in 1930, except in 1942 and 1946, due to World War II.

The tournament consists of two parts, the qualification phase and the final phase (officially called the World Cup Finals). The qualification phase, which currently take place over the three years preceding the Finals, is used to determine which teams qualify for the Finals. The current format of the Finals involves 32 teams competing for the title, at venues within the host nation (or nations) over a period of about a month. The World Cup Finals is the most widely viewed sporting event in the world, with an estimated 715.1 million people watching the 2006 tournament final.

In World Cup history, Poland has participated in nine World Cup editions, started with the 1938 World Cup where they lost to Brazil in a 5–6 thriller. It took Poland thirty-six years later to qualify for another World Cup, where they began to stun the world from eliminating former world champions England in 1974 qualification, to finishing third twice, in 1974 and 1982 editions. After participating in 1986, Poland started to decline and lost momentum in global football.

Since the fall of communist rule in Poland at 1989, Poland managed to qualify for 2002, 2006 and 2018 FIFA World Cups, but the team was unable to repeat the feat of the predecessors, went out from the group stage in all three tournaments with two opening losses before gained a consolidating win in the last match. In 2022, Poland, for the first time since 1986, didn't begin the tournament with a defeat, after holding Mexico goalless, and ultimately went on to advance to the knockout stage for the first time in 36 years.

World Cup record

Match records

1938 FIFA World Cup

First round

1974 FIFA World Cup

Group stage

Second group stage

Third place playoff

1978 FIFA World Cup

Group stage

Second group stage

1982 FIFA World Cup

Group stage

Second group stage

Semi-finals

Third place playoff

1986 FIFA World Cup

Group stage

Round of 16

2002 FIFA World Cup

Group stage

2006 FIFA World Cup

Group stage

2018 FIFA World Cup

Group stage

2022 FIFA World Cup

Group stage

Knockout stage

Round of 16

Record players

Władysław Żmuda, who participated in all four World Cups of Poland's Golden Generation, also holds the shared record as player with the most FIFA World Cup matches without ever winning the trophy. He is tied with Paolo Maldini and Uwe Seeler, but is the only one of those three from a country that has never won the World Cup, either.

Top goalscorers

Ernst Wilimowski was the first player ever to score four goals in one match at a FIFA World Cup, and to this day is the only player who managed this feat and still lost the match.

Goalscoring by Tournament

References

External links 
 Official website 
 FIFA Official Ranking of all Participants at Finals 1930–2002. FIFA Match Results for all Stages 1930–2002
 Poland at the FIFA official site
 Poland – Record International Players; most capped players & top goalscorers at RSSSF.com

 
Countries at the FIFA World Cup